The Bachelor is a 1999 American romantic comedy-drama fantasy film directed by Gary Sinyor and written by Steve Cohen. It is a remake of the 1925 film Seven Chances and stars Chris O'Donnell and Renée Zellweger. The film received negative reviews from critics and grossed $36.9 million against its $21 million budget. This film also marks Mariah Carey's acting debut.

Plot

A bachelor, after spoiling his proposal to his girlfriend of three years, discovers that his grandfather has died and left him the family business under the conditions that he be married by 6:05 p.m. on his 30th birthday (which is the next day), that he not be apart from his bride for more than a week at a time over the next 10 years of their marriage, and that they must attempt to produce a child sometime during the first five years of their marriage, leading the bachelor, his friends, and a priest to scramble over the next few hours in search of a bride.

If Jimmie fails, business competitor Oden Sports will buy the company. Meanwhile, Anne has second thoughts which she shares with her sister Natalie, talks Anne into going home to go visit their parents for the night.

A desperate Jimmie opens a shoebox full of photos of old girlfriends, and begins to track them down. First he sees Stacey, an oil futures trader, who turns out to be engaged. Second is Zoe, a window dresser. Jimmie goes to see her, but just after, he runs off after a woman who he thinks is Anne. He returns to find Zoe has set a mannequin on fire.

He strikes out with an opera singer and a cop. Soon his list is depleted, but his last choice accepts Buckley, who detests Jimmie but wants his money to prop up her family's fortune. As the priest tries to conduct the ceremony, she gradually learns the other conditions of the will. Horrified, she drives away.

Anne misses Jimmie and heads back to the city. Trying to locate him, she calls Marco to arrange dinner with Jimmie.

As everyone scrambles to help Jimmie save the family business, Jimmie realizes the "effect" of marriage, as the priest reveals how he took on the priesthood after his wife died, and that he was proud to be married and produce a family in the process.

Realizing that he loves Anne and is ready to 'take the plunge', Jimmie, after being up all night, rests in the church where Marco had promised to deliver a bride. He awakens to find hundreds of women dressed as brides waiting for him. After trying to settle the women down, Marco lies and says it was all a prank. Marco reveals that Anne is on her way back, so Jimmie flees to the train station, ordering a cake on the way. He makes it there after escaping the brides. He finds Anne in the train, but she has discovered a newspaper with its front page asking, "Would you marry this man for $100 million?" with Jimmie's picture beside. She is upset, but he professes his love for her and they reconcile.

Natalie finds a discarded wedding dress in the station, and Anne puts it on in the bathroom. She opens the door to see hundreds of brides run past, chasing Jimmie. Jimmie flees. He eventually climbs up a flight on a fire escape and shouts for Anne, as the brides gather below. The priest begins to conduct the ceremony over a loudspeaker from inside a police car, causing many 'brides' to attack the car. Anne, in the crowd, makes her way through and up to Jimmie.  Anne convinces the other women to be happy and let it be her day.

The priest finishes the ceremony by pronouncing them husband and wife, to cheers from all, and Jimmie and Anne kiss. They made it just in time before the deadline of 6:05 p.m. to inherit $100 million. She then tosses her bouquet into the teeming crowd below.

Cast
Chris O'Donnell - Jimmie Shannon
Renée Zellweger - Anne Arden
Artie Lange - Marco
Mariah Carey - Ilana
Edward Asner - Sid Gluckman
Hal Holbrook - Roy O'Dell
James Cromwell - The Priest
Marley Shelton - Natalie Arden
Peter Ustinov - Grandad James Shannon
Katharine Towne - Monique
Rebecca Cross - Stacey
Stacy Edwards - Zoe
Sarah Silverman - Carolyn
Jennifer Esposito - Daphne
Brooke Shields - Buckley Hale-Windsor
Anastasia Horne - Peppy Boor
Pat Finn - Bolt

Release

Critical reception
On the review aggregator website Rotten Tomatoes, 8% of 71 critics' reviews are positive, with an average rating of 3.6/10. The website's critics' consensus reads, "Clichéd, witless and irritating, The Bachelor proves Chris O'Donnell is no Buster Keaton."  Audiences surveyed by CinemaScore gave the film an average grade of "B–" on an A+ to F scale.

Stephen Holden on The New York Times said the film "builds up some of the zip of a silent-film comedy, although its satire is too broad to carry much of a sting." Gene Shalit on the Today Show called the film The funniest movie i've ever seen and the romantic comedy that recent memory

Box office
The film opened at number 3 at the North American box office behind The Bone Collector and House on Haunted Hill making $7.5 million USD in its opening weekend. The Bachelor ultimately grossed $37 million worldwide making it a modest box success.

References

External links
 
 
 
 
 

1999 films
1999 romantic comedy films
American fantasy films
Remakes of American films
American romantic comedy films
American romantic comedy-drama films
1999 fantasy films
1990s English-language films
Films about weddings in the United States
Films directed by Gary Sinyor
Films scored by John Murphy (composer)
Films set in San Francisco
Films set in the San Francisco Bay Area
Films shot in New Mexico
New Line Cinema films
Sound film remakes of silent films
1990s romantic comedy-drama films
1990s American films